Raja Jagat Chand (reigned c. 1708-1720) was the Chand king of Kumaon Kingdom. He ascended throne of Kumaon in 1708 CE after his father King Gyan Chand's death. In 1715 CE during Battle of Moradabad he defeated the unite forces of Garhwal Kingdom and Khalsa under Banda Singh Bahadur. He captured Srinagar, the capital of Garhwal.

References

Rajput rulers
History of Uttarakhand
1720 deaths
Year of birth unknown
18th-century Indian monarchs